Joshua Snyder  (1844–1881), was a professional baseball player who played outfielder in Major League Baseball for the 1872 Brooklyn Eckfords.

References

External links

Major League Baseball outfielders
Brooklyn Eckfords (NABBP) players
Brooklyn Eckfords players
19th-century baseball players
1844 births
1881 deaths
Baseball players from New York (state)
Burials at Cypress Hills Cemetery